The treaty of Mavelikkara was a treaty of peace and friendship concluded between Maharajah Anizham Thirunal Marthanda Varma of Travancore and the Dutch. According to this treaty both the parties agreed to live in friendship and peace.  The treaty was signed on 15 August 1753, at Mavelikkara.

The treaty effectively ended the political and commercial dominance of Dutch on Kerala coast.

References

1753 in India
1753 in the Dutch Republic
1753 treaties
History of Kerala